Bastiampillai is both a given name and a surname. Notable people with the name include:

 Bastiampillai Anthonipillai Thomas (1886–1964), Sri Lankan Roman Catholic priest 
 Bastiampillai Deogupillai (1917–2003), Sri Lankan Tamil priest
 Trevin Bastiampillai (born 1985), Canadian cricketer